Sir Ian Botham is a former international cricketer and captain of the England cricket team. He has claimed five-wicket hauls (taken five or more wickets in an innings) in Test cricket on 27 occasions, second only to James Anderson among English cricketers. A five-wicket haul is regarded as a notable achievement, and fewer than 40 bowlers have taken more than 15 five-wicket hauls at international level in their cricketing careers. Botham is generally considered one of the greatest all-rounders of all time. He was named as a Wisden Cricketer of the Year in 1978, and Indian Cricket Cricketer of the Year four years later. In 1992 he was awarded an Order of the British Empire (OBE), and he was knighted for his services to cricket and charity work in 2007. Two years later, he was honoured by the International Cricket Council, who named him as one of 55 initial inductees into the ICC Cricket Hall of Fame. He is sixth overall in all-time Test five-wicket haul takers.

He made his international debut for England on 26 August 1976 in a One Day International (ODI) against the West Indies. He made his Test cricket debut just under a year later against Australia, and it was during the first innings of this match that he claimed his first international five-wicket haul. It is against Australia that he has claimed the most five-wicket hauls, doing so on nine occasions. Three of these came during the 1981 Ashes series and, along with the two centuries he scored, saw the series dubbed "Botham's Ashes". He twice claimed eight wickets in an innings, playing at Lord's on each occasion, against Pakistan in 1978 and the West Indies in 1984. Including these performances, Botham has collected a five-wicket haul at Lord's eight times, more so than on any other ground.

Botham never managed to take five-wickets in an innings in ODI cricket, despite playing 116 matches and claiming 145 wickets, making him England's fourth highest wicket-taker in the format. His best return was four wickets, which he achieved on three occasions.

Key

Tests

Notes

References

Lists of English cricket records and statistics
Botham, Ian